Nu'u is a village on the island of Savai'i in Samoa. It is situated on the south coast of the island in Palauli district.

Also, the word nu'u in the Samoan language literally means village or the place a person 'belongs' to.

References

Populated places in Palauli